Qeshlaq-e Mashhadi Abu ol Hasan (also Romanized as Qeshlāq-e Mashhahdī Ābū ol Hasan) is a village in Valiabad Rural District, in the Central District of Qarchak County, Tehran Province, Iran. At the 2006 census, its population was 3,156, in 711 families.

References 

Populated places in Qarchak County